Darcy Gardiner (born 22 September 1995) is an Australian rules footballer who plays for the Brisbane Lions in the Australian Football League (AFL).

Recruited from the Queenscliff Coutas, Gardiner was drafted by the Lions with their second selection, pick 22, in the 2013 AFL Draft. AFL National Talent Manager Kevin Sheehan described Gardiner as the best tall defender in his draft.

Statistics
Updated to the end of the 2022 season.

|-
| 2014 ||  || 27
| 17 || 2 || 0 || 92 || 100 || 192 || 61 || 31 || 0.1 || 0.0 || 5.4 || 5.9 || 11.3 || 3.6 || 1.8
|-
| 2015 ||  || 27
| 8 || 1 || 0 || 42 || 34 || 76 || 22 || 16 || 0.1 || 0.0 || 5.3 || 4.3 || 9.5 || 2.8 || 2.0
|-
| 2016 ||  || 27
| 18 || 0 || 1 || 107 || 108 || 215 || 45 || 43 || 0.0 || 0.1 || 5.9 || 6.0 || 11.9 || 2.5 || 2.4
|-
| 2017 ||  || 27
| 19 || 1 || 1 || 134 || 110 || 244 || 89 || 44 || 0.1 || 0.1 || 7.1 || 5.8 || 12.8 || 4.7 || 2.3
|-
| 2018 ||  || 27
| 20 || 0 || 0 || 172 || 126 || 298 || 113 || 39 || 0.0 || 0.0 || 8.6 || 6.3 || 14.9 || 5.7 || 2.0
|-
| 2019 ||  || 27
| 24 || 1 || 0 || 239 || 87 || 326 || 112 || 53 || 0.0 || 0.0 || 10.0 || 3.6 || 13.6 || 4.7 || 2.2
|-
| 2020 ||  || 27
| 18 || 0 || 0 || 139 || 60 || 199 || 71 || 25 || 0.0 || 0.0 || 7.7 || 3.3 || 11.1 || 3.9 || 1.4
|-
| 2021 ||  || 27
| 9 || 0 || 0 || 61 || 38 || 99 || 34 || 4 || 0.0 || 0.0 || 6.8 || 4.2 || 11.0 || 3.8 || 0.4
|-
| 2022 ||  || 27
| 21 || 0 || 0 || 168 || 93 || 261 || 100 || 32 || 0.0 || 0.0 || 8.0 || 4.4 || 12.4 || 4.8 || 1.5
|- class=sortbottom
! colspan=3 | Career
! 154 !! 5 !! 2 !! 1154 !! 756 !! 1910 !! 647 !! 287 !! 0.0 !! 0.0 !! 7.5 !! 4.9 !! 12.4 !! 4.2 !! 1.9
|}

Notes

Honours and achievements
Individual
 AFL Rising Star nominee: 2014 (round 19)

References

External links

1995 births
Living people
Brisbane Lions players
Geelong Falcons players
Australian rules footballers from Victoria (Australia)